Putnam Hall is an unincorporated community in Putnam County, Florida, United States. It is located near the State Road 100/State Road 26 intersection.
   
It was settled by Elijah Wall of South Carolina in 1849. This was the home of Putnam county's first representative to legislature, Wall's son John P Wall, who while living there served six sessions as a representative.

Geography
Putnam Hall is located at  (29.7364, -81.9594).

References

Unincorporated communities in Putnam County, Florida
Unincorporated communities in Florida
1849 establishments in Florida